Šimėnas Cabinet was the 2nd cabinet of Lithuania since the declaration of independence in 1990. It consisted of the Prime Minister and 17 government ministers.

Albertas Šimėnas was appointed as the Prime Minister by the Supreme Council of Lithuania on 10 January 1991, following the dismissal of the previous cabinet.

Only three days later, the January events took place in Vilnius, threatening the fledgling government. During the events, Šimėnas failed to appear at a government meeting after being called for and could not be located, prompting the Supreme Council to dismiss him on January 13 and appoint Gediminas Vagnorius in his place. It would later emerge that Šimėnas had left Vilnius and spent the night in the relative safety of Druskininkai.

As of 2016, it has remained the shortest-lived government of Lithuania.

Cabinet
The following ministers served on the Šimėnas Cabinet.

References 

Cabinet of Lithuania
1991 establishments in Lithuania
1991 disestablishments in Lithuania
Cabinets established in 1991
Cabinets disestablished in 1991